Michael Patrick Byrne (born 28 April 1978) is an Australian poet, reviewer, anthologist and freelance poetry tutor.  He was born in Sydney, spent his early childhood in Tuross Head on the New South Wales South Coast, and came to Canberra in 1987, where he currently lives.  Byrne attended high school at Radford College in Canberra, graduating in 1996.  In 1998 he undertook an Arts degree from the Australian National University, completing it in 2001.  In 2003 he began a Masters in Journalism from the University of Wollongong, completing it in 2004.  In 2007, he worked for The Word Magazine for two months as a journalist, salesman and researcher.  In March 2008, he had two poems published in Quadrant. In March 2011, he had another poem published in Quadrant.

Awards
 1996: The Canberra Times Young Writers Competition (College Poetry) first prize for ‘Estuary at Dusk’.
 2006: Winner of the ACT Writing and Publishing Award for Poetry for his book ‘Southbound’.
 2011: Winner of the ACT Writing and Publishing Award for Poetry for his book 'A Man of Emails'.
 2012: Winner of the ACT Writing and Publishing Award for Poetry for his anthology ‘The Indigo Book of Australian Prose Poems’.

Readings

 1999: Young Poets Reading, Chat's Café, ANU Campus.
 2004: New Voices Reading, Red Belly Black, Civic.
 2007: Emerging Poets Reading, The God's Café, ANU Campus.
 2009: Verse in The Vines, Mount Majura Vineyard, Mount Majura.
 2012: Canberra Poets Reading, The God's Cafe, ANU Campus.
 2013: Three Poets Reading, Manning Clark House, Canberra.

Books
 2001: Estuary at Dusk: Poems 1995-2000, Ginninderra Press. 
 2005: Southbound, Ginninderra Press. 
 2006: On Common Water (Editor), Ginninderra Press. 
 2010: A Man of Emails, Ginninderra Press. 
 2011: The Indigo Book of Australian Prose Poems (Editor), Ginninderra Press. 
 2014: New & Selected Poems, Ginninderra Press. 
 2020: A Life in Writing (Autobiography), Ginninderra Press.

References

Living people
Australian poets
1978 births
University of Wollongong alumni